Gajju Matta (Urdu) is a neighbourhood and union council (UC 145) located in Nishtar Tehsil of Lahore, Punjab, Pakistan. Gajjumata Metrobus Terminal Station serves as the southern terminus of the Lahore Metrobus.

References 

Nishtar Town